3322 Lidiya, provisional designation , is a stony Phocaea asteroid and potentially slow rotator from the inner regions of the asteroid belt, approximately 7 kilometers in diameter. It was discovered on 1 December 1975, by Soviet astronomer Tamara Smirnova at the Crimean Astrophysical Observatory in Nauchnij, on the Crimean peninsula. The asteroid was named after Russian aviator Lidiya Zvereva.

Orbit and classification 

Lidiya is a member of the Phocaea family, a large asteroid family of inner-belt asteroids with a stony composition. It orbits the Sun at a distance of 1.9–2.9 AU once every 3 years and 8 months (1,351 days). Its orbit has an eccentricity of 0.22 and an inclination of 23° with respect to the ecliptic.

Physical characteristics 

Lidiya has been characterized as a stony S-type asteroid by PanSTARRS photometric survey.

Potentially slow rotator 

In December 2012, a fragmentary rotational lightcurve of Lidiya was obtained from photometric observations at the Altimira Observatory in California. Lightcurve analysis gave a rotation period of 710 hours with a brightness amplitude of 0.60 magnitude. This would make Lidiya one of the slowest rotators known to exist. However, since the lightcurve has such a poor quality rating, it is only a potentially slow rotator.

Diameter and albedo 

According to the survey carried out by the NEOWISE mission of NASA's Wide-field Infrared Survey Explorer, Lidiya measures 6.388 and 7.189 kilometers in diameter and its surface has an albedo of 0.350 and 0.3776, respectively.

The Collaborative Asteroid Lightcurve Link assumes an albedo of 0.23 – derived from 25 Phocaea, the Phocaea family's largest member and namesake – and calculates a diameter of 7.99 kilometers based on an absolute magnitude of 12.7.

Naming 

This minor planet was named after Russian aviator Lidiya Vissarionovna Zvereva (1890–1916), the first Russian female pilot, who began flying in 1911. She was also an instructor of other pilots and involved in the construction of airplanes. The official naming citation was published by the Minor Planet Center on 4 October 1990. The crater on Venus, Zvereva was also named in her honor in 1985.

Notes

References

External links 
 Asteroid Lightcurve Database (LCDB), query form (info )
 Dictionary of Minor Planet Names, Google books
 Asteroids and comets rotation curves, CdR – Observatoire de Genève, Raoul Behrend
 Discovery Circumstances: Numbered Minor Planets (1)-(5000) – Minor Planet Center
 
 

003322
Discoveries by Tamara Mikhaylovna Smirnova
Named minor planets
19751201